The rocky finger of the Pointe du Grouin points out and protects the entrance into the bay of Mont Saint-Michel.

On this headland, a Grande Randonnée footpath runs around hugging the cliff face and there is a circular walk starting out from Cancale.

On their way the walker can enjoy views of the Île des Landes a long barren outcrop (now a bird sanctuary), the lighthouse, the Îles Chausey, Granville on the Normandy coast, and, on a clear day, the outline of Mont Saint-Michel.

Climate

References

Landforms of Ille-et-Vilaine
Headlands of Brittany
Tourist attractions in Ille-et-Vilaine